State Highway 58 (Andhra Pradesh) is a state highway in the Indian state of Andhra Pradesh

Route 

It starts at Gudur and ends at Rajampet.

See also 
 List of State Highways in Andhra Pradesh

References 

State Highways in Andhra Pradesh
Roads in Kadapa district
Roads in Nellore district